Norfolk International Airport  is seven miles (11 km) northeast of downtown Norfolk, an independent city in Virginia, United States. It is owned and operated by the Norfolk Airport Authority: a bureau under the municipal government. The airport serves the Hampton Roads metropolitan area of southeast Virginia (along with Newport News/Williamsburg International Airport in Newport News) as well as northeast North Carolina. Despite its name, the airport does not have any international destinations nonstop.

The Federal Aviation Administration (FAA) 2021 categorized it as a medium hub airport. 

, with a passenger count of 1,658,000 people, Norfolk International was ranked as the 65th-busiest airport in the United States and the third-busiest in Virginia in terms of passengers served annually, behind Dulles International Airport and Reagan National Airport, but just ahead of Richmond International.  Delta Air Lines has the largest share of passenger traffic, followed by Southwest Airlines and American Airlines.

History

The airport was first established in 1938 as Norfolk Municipal Airport; from 1942 until 1947 it was run by the United States Army Air Forces. In 1968 its name changed to Norfolk Regional Airport, and in 1976 it was renamed again to the present Norfolk International Airport.

Facilities
The airport covers 1,300 acres (526 ha) at an elevation of 27 feet (8 m). Its main runway, 5–23, is 9,001 by 150 feet (2,744 x 46 m), and crosswind runway 14–32 is 4,875 by 150 feet (1,486 x 46 m).

The crosswind runway (14–32) was closed for renovations on December 19, 2009, and reopened in the spring of 2011. The airport's long-term plan calls for this runway to be destroyed to make way for a parallel runway (5R-23L) east of runway 5–23, but the FAA grounded the plan in the summer of 2016 due to diminishing demand, limited space, and environmental impacts.

In 2017 the airport had 67,679 aircraft operations, an average of 185 per day: 39% airline, 27% air taxi, 27% general aviation, and 2% military. In November 2018, 95 aircraft were based at the airport: 52 single-engine, 20 multi-engine, 20 jet, and 3 helicopters.

General aviation services, or fixed-base operations, are provided by Signature Flight Support with full-service facilities for maintaining and housing private and corporate aircraft. The modern  terminal facility offers everything from aircraft rental to sightseeing flights and aircraft repair.

Daily scheduled aircraft include  ERJ140/145 (United, American), CRJ200/700/900 (Delta, United, American), ERJ170/175 (American, United), A300 (FedEx), A319/320 (United, Allegiant, American, Frontier), B717 (Delta), B737 (Southwest, American, Delta), and B757 (UPS and Delta).

FAA control tower
Operated and managed by the Federal Aviation Administration, the Norfolk Tower handles about 1,100 aircraft per day, 24 hours per day and 365 days per year. Radar coverage is provided by the ASR-9 terminal system with a six-level weather detection capability. Also available for use is an Enhanced Target Generator (ETG) lab with two radar scopes to accomplish training objectives, as well as the IDS4 system, a specialized microcomputer network system designed to distribute and display both static and real-time data regarding weather and other rapidly changing critical information to air traffic controllers.

Gates
Norfolk International Airport has two passenger concourses: Concourse A (gates A1-A11), and Concourse B (gates B16-B30). American Airlines and Southwest Airlines occupy Concourse A while Allegiant Air, Delta Airlines, Frontier Airlines,  and United Airlines occupy Concourse B. International flights are handled at gate A1; however, there are currently no scheduled international flights. Specific gate locations are the following: American A2, A4, A6-A11, Delta B21-B25, Southwest A3 and A5, United B27-B30, with Allegiant and Frontier using common gates of B16, B17, B18, B20. Concourse B gates B22 and B26 are no longer in use.

Cargo yard
About 70 million pounds of air cargo are shipped in and out of Norfolk International Airport each year.
NIA houses one of the most modern and efficient air cargo facilities in the state. Its two modern air cargo terminals have  of space. A ramp provides direct access from the plane to the warehouse.

Airlines and destinations

Passenger

Cargo

Statistics

Airline market share

Top destinations

Annual traffic

Passenger development

Ground Transportation
There are no bus or shuttle services to and from Norfolk International Airport.

All ground transportation services are located in the arrivals terminal. There are several on-site rental car companies, an authorized shuttle service providing door-to-door service to the entire Hampton Roads area, and taxis available through several companies. Both Uber and Lyft service the airport through an agreement with the airport authority.

Parking

A nine-level parking garage adjacent to the new arrivals terminal opened in July 2002. It provides 2,800 covered spaces for short-term, long-term, and rental parking. Overall, NIA parking facilities can accommodate 7,000 vehicles.
In February 2019, the airport announced it would begin construction of a brand new 1.09 million square foot parking garage. Construction started in July 2019. This new parking garage will consolidate all parking lots at ORF. It will also replace the employee shuttle that costs over $600,000 a year to operate.

Accidents and incidents
 On January 19, 1967, a United Airlines Vickers 754D Viscount collided with a snow plow that had entered the runway in the path of the United plane upon landing. All 50 passengers and crew on board the aircraft survived; the aircraft suffered major damage to its airframe and was written off.
 On September 1, 1974 a Martin 4-0-4 which was sitting empty on the ramp caught fire, damaging the airframe beyond repair. The cause of the fire was never determined.

See also

 Virginia World War II Army Airfields
 List of airports in Virginia

References

External links

 
 
 

 Live webcam image from WAVY-TV
 Airport pictures
 Main terminal building and pedestrian bridge
 Rendering of present configuration of terminal
 Rendering of future configuration of terminal with planned expansion
 http://www.howardmodels.com/Architectural-Scale-Models/Norfolk-Airport/pic4.jpg
 Aerial picture

Airports in Virginia
Transportation in Norfolk, Virginia
Airfields of the United States Army Air Forces in Virginia
1938 establishments in Virginia
Airports established in 1938